Parorsidis is a genus of longhorn beetles of the subfamily Lamiinae.

 Parorsidis ceylanica Breuning, 1982
 Parorsidis delevauxi Breuning, 1962
 Parorsidis nigrosparsa (Pic, 1929)
 Parorsidis rondoni (Breuning, 1962)
 Parorsidis transversevittata Breuning, 1963

References

Ancylonotini